Events from the year 1798 in Scotland.

Incumbents

Law officers 
 Lord Advocate – Robert Dundas of Arniston
 Solicitor General for Scotland – Robert Blair

Judiciary 
 Lord President of the Court of Session – Lord Succoth
 Lord Justice General – The Duke of Montrose* Lord Justice Clerk – Lord Braxfield

Events 
 11 March – Dundee Infirmary opened.
 26 May – Battle of Tara Hill in the Irish Rebellion of 1798: British forces including three companies of the Reay Fencibles (formed primarily from the Clan Mackay) drive rebels of the Society of United Irishmen from their position with around 400 of the latter killed and only 26 Reay casualties.
 14 July – United States Consulate in Edinburgh opens.
 4 December – British Prime Minister William Pitt the Younger announces the introduction of income tax in 1799.
 Highland Park distillery is founded in Kirkwall.
 Tobermory distillery is founded.
 The Merchant Banking Company of Glasgow fails.
 The Ayrshire Regiment of Yeomanry Cavalry is formally adopted into the British Army.

Births 
 3 February – Daniel Sandford, Greek scholar, professor and Member of parliament for Paisley (died 1838)
 March – David Hay, interior decorator (died 1866)
 28 April – Duncan Forbes, linguist (died 1868)
 23 July – James Hyslop, poet (died 1827)
 24 July – Mark Napier, lawyer, sheriff, biographer and historical author (died 1879)
 13 October – Robert Crichton Wyllie, physician, businessman and Minister of Foreign Affairs in the Kingdom of Hawaii (died 1865)
 27 December – Alexander Colquhoun-Stirling-Murray-Dunlop, Member of Parliament for Greenock from 1852 to 1868 (died 1870)
 28 December – Thomas James Henderson, astronomer (died 1844)

Deaths 
 21 November – Thomas Hardy, minister (born 1748)

References 

 
Years of the 18th century in Scotland
Scotland
1790s in Scotland